is a village located in Nakagami District, Okinawa Prefecture, Japan.

Geography 
Yomitan is located on the western coast of the central part of Okinawa Island. The village is bound to the north by Onna, to the east by Okinawa City, to the south by Kadena, and to the west by the East China Sea.

31.5% of the land area is zoned for agriculture, 35.7% is zoned as forest, 12.3% is zoned for housing, and the remaining 20.6% is zoned for other uses.

History 
In 1416, the Aji of Yomitanzan Magiri, Gosamaru, helped Shō Hashi invade Hokuzan. Although Gosamaru lived in Yamada Castle, Shō Hashi allowed him to build Zakimi Castle. The castle, along with other castle sites in Okinawa, was designated a World Heritage Site by UNESCO in November 2000. The port of Hamanaga, which was located in the north of Yomitanzan, was an important center of Nanban, or "southern barbarian", trade of the Ryukyu Kingdom. Yomitanzan was also the site of a landing during the Invasion of Ryukyu by Satsuma Domain in 1609. After Japan annexed Ryukyu in 1879, Yomitanzan continued to be a magiri; all of the magiri were abolished in 1907 and Yomitanzan became a village.

Yomitan was the initial site of fighting on Okinawa Island during World War II. Zakimi Castle was used as a gun emplacement by the Japanese military. The Hija River, between Yomitan and then-Chatan (Kadena area), was the site of the initial landing of the Allied forces in the Battle of Okinawa. The United States Marine Corps landed on the Yomitan-side of the river, while the United States Army landed on the Chatan side. The village is known for one of the most devastating examples of mass suicide during World War II. Villagers took refuge in Chibichiri Cave during the Battle of Okinawa. Faced with the rapid advance of American troops, approximately 140 men, women, and children were convinced or ordered by the Japanese military to commit mass suicide (shūdan jiketsu) on April 2, 1945. After the war, the village was renamed Yomitan.

Population 

Government 
The mayor of Yomitan is Denjitsu Ishimine. As Yomitan is designated as a village, it is under the administration of Nakagami District. Once Yomitan reaches a population of over 50,000 it can then be classified as a city , thereby gaining a measure of autonomy and independence.

The village has adopted as its symbol the flying phoenix, playing on the fact that the shape of the village resembles a bird in flight. The village flower is the bougainvillea.

Industry 
6% of the working population of Yomitan is engaged in so-called "primary" industries, including agriculture and fishing. 25% is engaged in the "secondary" industries, i.e. food processing and manufacturing; and 69% is engaged in the "tertiary" industries, services and trade.

Agriculture 
The chief cash crop of Yomitan is the chrysanthemum, which, unlike in mainland Japan, can be grown in Okinawa during the winter months with the aid of artificial light at night. Chrysanthemums are followed in value by sugarcane and pigs, in that order.

Sugarcane is particularly suited to cultivation in Okinawa, as it does not require significant infrastructure (such as irrigation), grows well in Okinawa's soil, and can be left unattended for 18 months until harvest. The harvesting, refining, and butchering of commercial agricultural products are coordinated by the National Mutual Insurance Federation of Agricultural Cooperatives (JA), and the growers receive a share of the profits.

Sweet potato cultivation first reached Japan via Okinawa from present-day Taiwan, predating rice cultivation, and either Yomitan or neighboring Kadena can lay claim as the first cultivators of sweet potato in Japan.

Culture 
In addition to beautiful and largely unspoiled beaches, Yomitan attracts tourists for its folk crafts, including Ryukyuan pottery (yachimun, or やちむん in Okinawan), glassblowing (Ryukyu glass being a famed product), sugar making, and salt making. There are several facilities where tourists can try their hand at these crafts and take their handiwork home as souvenirs.

U.S. military bases 
Approximately , which is 36% of the area of the village, is leased to the Ministry of Defense of Japan and used as United States military bases under the U.S.–Japan Status of Forces Agreement. Areas outside the current boundary of Torii Station were developed as American family housing, but have been returned to Okinawan ownership.

Two facilities, Torii Communication Station (Army; 194 ha) and a part of Kadena Ammunition Storage Area (Air Force and Marine; 1066 ha), are located in the village. Senaha Communication Site (Air Force; 61 ha), Sobe Communication Site (aka Elephant Cage, decommissioned in 2006, Navy; 54 ha), and Yomitan Auxiliary Airfield (Marine; 191 ha) were returned in 2007 and have been developed into the Yomitan Village Office and civic facilities, including running tracks and baseball fields.

Transportation 
Yomitan is connected to Naha and other areas of Okinawa Island by bus. The town is crossed by Japan National Route 58.

Notable people from Yomitan 
Tsutomu Aragaki, tenor
Keiko Itokazu, politician
Tokushin Yamauchi, politician
Chōbyō Yara, former politician

References

External links 

 
 

Villages in Okinawa Prefecture